Nepal Doorsanchar Company Ltd., popularly known as Nepal Telecom or NTC, is a state-owned telecommunications service provider in Nepal with 91.49% of the government share. The company was a monopoly until 2003 when the first private sector operator United Telecom Limited(UTL) started providing basic telephony services. The central office of Nepal Telecom is located at Bhadrakali Plaza, Kathmandu. It has branches, exchanges and other offices in 184 locations within the country.

It is the sole provider of fixed-line, ISDN and leased-line services in Nepal. Following the entry of Ncell (previously called Mero Mobile) into Nepal's telecommunications industry in 2005, it is no longer the only provider of GSM mobile service. With more than 5,400 employees, it is one of the largest corporations of Nepal. It has a total of 262 telephone exchanges in various parts of the country serving 603,291 PSTN lines, more than 5 million GSM cellular phones and more than a million CDMA phone lines as of July 2011.

According to recent data, there are about 20 million users of Nepal Telecom including all those of fixed landline, GSM mobile, CDMA and internet service. Nepal Telecom Launched 4G LTE Service on 1 January 2017. It is the first operator to provide 4G LTE service in Nepal on a technology-neutral frequency band of 1800 MHz as standard for 4G in Nepal. Till the date, 4G is available in all of the seven provinces present in Nepal. In July 2019, Nepal Telecom had successfully tested VoLTE service for the first time in Nepal and is available for users starting May 17, 2021. According to the MIS report published by Nepal Telecommunication Authority in April 2019, Nepal Telecom had the largest cable internet subscribers of hovering 211,513 covering 84% of all the cable internet market. Similarly, Nepal Telecom being a sole provider of WiMAX, had 87,977 subscribers by the end of April 2019. On 2 October 2019, Nepal Telecom expanded their 4G service to 60 cities of 37 districts, which was inaugurated by the then Prime Minister KP Sharma Oli.

History 
As per the Government of Nepal's Fourth Plan, telecommunication service was first constructed in Nepal in the year 1913 with a service between Kathmandu and Raxaul, India. A 110km line between the two locations came into service in 1914. A 518km line between Kathmandu and Dhankuta was constructed in 1936 and Palpa was connected to Kathmandu with a 240km telephone line. 1935 saw the installation of 25 'automatic' telephone lines in Kathmandu. Almost two decades later in 1953, Palpa and Bhairahawa were connected. Dhulikhel got connected with Kathmandu with a 29km line. An exchange called Central Battery (CB) got installed in 1950 and for the first time, telecommunication service was opened to the public. The exchange capacity was increased to 300 in 1957.

Wireless service first started in Nepal in 1950 with service to Kathmandu, Bhairahawa, Illam, Dhankuta and Biratnagar. 1952 saw the expansion of service to Doti, Dang, Jumla, Dailekh, Sallyan, Okhaldhunga and Rajbiraj. Servers to Jaleshwar, Ramechhap, Bandipur, Terathum, Taplejung, Dandeldhura and Baitadi were added later. Sub-stations were also setup in Baglung, Palpa and Dhangadi in 1952. Similarly, new stations were added in Pokhara, Bhojpur and Birgunj.The Department of Communications initially looked after the Postal Service and Telecommunications, together. 1959 saw the creation of a separate Department of Telecommunication.

Nepal Telecom was legally founded as a fully owned Government Corporation called Nepal Telecommunications Corporation in 2032 B.S for the goal of offering telecommunications services after the adoption of the Communications Corporation Act 2028. Beyond everything, Nepal Telecommunication Corporation was turned into Nepal Doorsanchar Company Limited (NDCL) on Baisakh 1, 2061, after serving the people for 29 years with tremendous pleasure and achievement.

The Nepal Doorsanchar Company Limited was incorporated under the Companies Act of 2053. Although, the company's registered trademark "Nepal Telecom-NT" or "Nepal Telecommunication Corporation-NTC" is well known among the general population. This is where Nepal Telecom's tale begins.

After 2060 B.S., Nepal Telecom began offering GSM (Global System for Mobile Communication) services to the entire population. In addition to GSM, Nepal Telecom offers CDMA (Code Division Multiple Access), EVDO, ADSL, FTTH, and other services.

Nepal Telecom continues to upgrade and update its services, providing the most up-to-date services ranging from early GPRS, HSDPA, 3G, and now 4G/LTE.

As a public business, Nepal Telecom is solely responsible for providing services to all parts of the country. They are offering services in rural parts where other operators have failed in a sense of responsibilities.

Network information

Share structure

Services 
 Leased line
 Basic Telephony
 ISDN
 GSM Cellular Telephony
 Email
 Internet Leased Line
 Payphone
 CDMA Network as SkyPhone (scheduled for discontinuation)
 Wireless Loop Link
 CDMA EV-DO
 3G, HSDPA
 4G LTE
 Intelligent Network
 Voice Mail
 GPRS Service
 MMS
 Digital Data Network
 ADSL
 WiMAX
 MPOS
 WiFi Hotspot
 Fiber to the Home (FTTH)
 eSIM

See also
 SmartCell
 Ncell

References

External links 
 

Government-owned companies of Nepal
Telecommunications in Nepal
Communications in Asia
Telecommunications companies of Nepal
Government-owned telecommunications companies